

Ernst Kühl (24 October 1888 – 2 February 1972) was a German officer in the Luftwaffe during World War II. He was a recipient of the Knight's Cross of the Iron Cross with Oak Leaves of Nazi Germany.

Awards and decorations

 Clasp to the Iron Cross (1939) 2nd Class (1939) & 1st Class (1940)
 German Cross in Gold on 21 August 1942 as Oberstleutnant in the II./Kampfgeschwader 55
 Knight's Cross of the Iron Cross with Oak Leaves
 Knight's Cross on 17 October 1942 as Oberstleutnant of the Reserve and Geschwaderkommodore of Kampfgeschwader 55
 356th Oak Leaves on 18 December 1943 as Oberst of the Reserves and Geschwaderkommodore of Kampfgeschwader 55 "Greif"
 Great Cross of Merit of the Federal Republic of Germany

References

Citations

Bibliography

 
 
 

1888 births
1972 deaths
Military personnel from Wrocław
People from the Province of Silesia
Luftwaffe pilots
German World War II pilots
German Army personnel of World War I
Recipients of the clasp to the Iron Cross, 1st class
Recipients of the Gold German Cross
Recipients of the Knight's Cross of the Iron Cross with Oak Leaves
Commanders Crosses of the Order of Merit of the Federal Republic of Germany
German prisoners of war in World War II held by the United Kingdom